The 31st edition of the annual Hypo-Meeting took place on 28 May and 29 May 2005 in Götzis, Austria. The track and field competition, featuring a decathlon (men) and a heptathlon (women) event, was part of the 2005 IAAF World Combined Events Challenge.

Men's decathlon

Schedule

28 May

29 May

Records

Results

Women's heptathlon

Schedule

28 May

29 May

Records

Results

See also
2005 World Championships in Athletics – Men's decathlon
Athletics at the 2005 Summer Universiade – Men's decathlon
2005 World Championships in Athletics – Women's heptathlon
2005 Décastar
2005 Decathlon Year Ranking

References
 decathlon2000
 IAAF results

2005
Hypo-Meeting
Hypo-Meeting